This is a list of rosters of the UCI Continental team, Adria Mobil, categorised by season.

2022

2021
Ages as at 1 January 2021.

2020
Ages as of 1 January 2020.

2019
Ages as of 1 January 2019.

2018
As of 1 September 2018.

2017
Ages as at 1 January 2017.

2016
As of 29 February 2016.

2015
Ages as at 1 January 2015.

2014
Ages as at 1 January 2014.

2013
Ages as at 1 January 2013.

2012
Ages as at 1 January 2012.

2011
Ages as at 1 January 2011.

2010
Ages as at 1 January 2010.

2009

2008

2007

2006

2005

References

Slovenian cyclists
Lists of cyclists by team